All About Memphis is an album by clarinetist Buster Bailey which was recorded in 1958 and released on the Felsted label.

Reception

Scott Yanow of AllMusic states, "Buster Bailey was one of the top clarinetists to emerge during the 1920s but he led relatively few sessions throughout his long career. ... In addition to W.C. Handy tunes, the other five songs are Bailey originals that mix together swing and the flavor of New Orleans jazz. It's a fine outing for the classic clarinetist". On All About Jazz Andrew J. Sammut said "Fortunately jazz raconteur Stanley Dance saw fit to put just Bailey (and some of his original compositions) in front of a rhythm section on the short-lived Felsted label, highlighting the phenomenal technique that kept him so consistently in demand ... After so many years of Bailey sharing solo space alongside more famous colleagues, and even on his own date, it's still surprising but also rewarding to hear Bailey cutting loose".

Track listing
All compositions by Buster Bailey except where noted.
 "Bear Wallow" (Buster Bailey, Dick Vance) – 7:22
 "Hatton Avenue & Gayoso Street" (Bailey, Vance) – 4:08
 "Sunday Parade" (Bailey, Vance) – 5:31
 "Beale Street Blues" (W. C. Handy) – 4:08
 "Memphis Blues" (Handy) – 7:36
 "Chickasaw Bluff" – 6:08
 "Hot Water Bayou" – 4:22

Personnel
Buster Bailey – clarinet
Herman Autrey – trumpet (tracks 1, 3 and 6)
Vic Dickenson – trombone (tracks  1, 3 and 6)
Hilton Jefferson – alto saxophone (tracks  1, 3 and 6)
Red Richards – piano
Gene Ramey – bass
Jimmy Crawford – drums

References

Buster Bailey albums
1958 albums
Felsted Records albums